Nakhl-e Gol is a village in Suza Rural District, Shahab District, Qeshm County, Hormozgan Province, Iran. At the 2006 census, its population was 218, in 39 families.

References 

Populated places in Qeshm County